Claudia Fabiola Ibarra Muro (born 2 February 1994) is a Mexican footballer. She is a forward who plays for Atlas in the Mexican Liga MX Femenil and for the Mexico women's national football team.

Playing career

Club
Ibarra gained experience playing in the United States at Cerritos College in California and she played in the WPSL with Tijuana Xolos USA.

In May 2016 she signed with the WPSL team Michigan Chill SC.

In April 2017 she rejoined her formed club, Tijuana Xolas, in the newly formed Mexican women's league Liga MX Femenil.

In June 2017 she was released from Tijuana Xolas and joined Tigres UANL of Monterrey. They went on to win the Liga MX Femenil championship in the league's inaugural season.

In June 2018 she was released from Tigres UANL and joined Atlas in her hometown of Guadalajara.

International
Ibarra's international career began when she was called into the U-17 Mexico national team in 2006. In 2010, Ibarra played at the U-17 World Cup qualifiers in Costa Rica where Mexico finished the competition as runners up. That same year she played at the U-17 World Cup in Trinidad & Tobago where Ibarra's outstanding performances throughout the competitions led her to be a part of the 2014 U-20 World Cup qualifiers in the Cayman Islands where Mexico, once again, would finish as runners up. Her progression and hard work continued to capture the eye of the coaching staff and she was named to the squad to travel to the 2014 U-20 World Cup in Canada. In 2015, Ibarra was included in Mexico women's national football team for the 2015 FIFA Women's World Cup in Canada where in the group game against England, Ibarra scored her first senior international goal. Ibarra also played in the 2015 Pan American Games and earned a bronze medal with Mexico in 2015.

Honours

Club
UANL
Liga MX Femenil: Clausura 2018

Individual
Liga MX Femenil Top Scorer: 2019

References

External links
 
  
 
 
 
 

1994 births
Living people
2015 FIFA Women's World Cup players
Mexican women's footballers
Mexico women's international footballers
Women's association football midfielders
Footballers from Guadalajara, Jalisco
Liga MX Femenil players
Tigres UANL (women) footballers
Atlas F.C. (women) footballers
Mexican expatriate women's footballers
Mexican expatriate sportspeople in the United States
Expatriate women's soccer players in the United States
Footballers at the 2015 Pan American Games
Medalists at the 2015 Pan American Games
Pan American Games bronze medalists for Mexico
Pan American Games medalists in football
Mexican footballers